Traces Best of 2005–2009  is the second compilation album by The Gazette, featuring songs from 2005 to 2009 like "Reila", "Cassis", "Shadow VI II I", "Regret", "Filth in the Beauty", "Hyena", "Burial Applicant", "Guren", "Leech", "Distress and Coma", "The Invisible Wall", and "Before I Decay". It peaked at the nineteenth position on the Oricon charts.

Track listing

Notes
This album was scheduled to be released on March 23, 2011, but the release was delayed two weeks due to the 2011 Tōhoku earthquake and tsunami.

Personnel 
 Ruki – vocals
 Uruha – lead guitar, backing vocals
 Aoi – rhythm guitar, backing vocals
 Reita – bass guitar, backing vocals
 Kai – drums, percussion

References

2011 greatest hits albums
The Gazette (band) albums
Japanese-language compilation albums